On 21 June 2017 two occupants of a car were attacked with acid in Beckton in the London Borough of Newham. The perpetrator was John Tomlin and the victims were later named as Jameel Muhktar and his cousin and aspiring model Resham Khan. Their injuries were described as "life-changing". Police investigated the incident as a hate crime, and the victims believe the incident represented rising Islamophobia in the United Kingdom. However, the judge said there was no evidence of a racial motivation. Tomlin was sentenced to 16 years imprisonment on 18 April 2018.

Background
The Beckton attack was part of a series of acid attacks targeting British Asians in London. However, not all acid attacks were similarly classified as hate crimes. The London boroughs of Newham and Tower Hamlets are among the areas of London where acid attacks are most common.

Attack
At 9:13 a.m. BST on Wednesday, 21 June 2017, Jameel Muhktar and Resham Khan were sitting in a stationary car stopped at traffic lights on Tollgate Road, Beckton. A white male approached and threw a corrosive liquid onto them. Both suffered severe burns with their injuries described by the Metropolitan Police as "life-changing".

Khan needed skin grafts to her face and body whilst Muhktar suffered wounds to his stomach, face, neck, ears, arms and back requiring extensive surgery. Muhktar described his clothes and shoes melting following the attack.

Investigation
While investigators originally ruled out a religious or racial motive for the crime, the Metropolitan Police declared that new evidence which had been uncovered on 30 June led them to ultimately investigate the assault as a hate crime. The judge said that there was no evidence that it was a hate crime.

Suspect
The Metropolitan Police later stated it was seeking to speak to John Tomlin, a 24-year-old man known to frequent Canning Town in relation to the incident. His Facebook page contained links to the far-right. Tomlin turned himself in to the Metropolitan Police on 9 July 2017. He was charged with causing grievous bodily harm and appeared at Thames Magistrates' Court on 11 July. He was remanded in custody and ordered to appear at Snaresbrook Crown Court on 8 August. At his hearing on 11 John Tomlin blew kisses at his supporters while in court.

Reaction
The Wharf, a local newspaper, reported that residents were concerned about the increasing number of attacks involving noxious substances in East London. Following an incident in which a man sitting in a car in Commercial Road, Tower Hamlets had a noxious liquid, believed to be bleach, thrown in his face and his car stolen, the Mayor of Tower Hamlets, John Biggs issued a statement seeking to reassure residents.

Stand Up To Racism announced a "vigil in solidarity with Resham and Jameel, and the victims of anti-Muslim hate crime" planned to be held outside Stratford station on 5 July.

A crowdfunding campaign set up to help support the pair's aftercare has raised over £46,000.

Criticism of media coverage and police response
Jameel Muhktar criticised the initial lack of media coverage and the framing of the incident. Muhktar told Channel 4 News that "If this was an Asian guy like myself, going up to an English couple in a car and acid attacking them, I know for a fact and the whole country knows that it would be classed as a terror attack". He suggested the incident may have been motivated by Islamophobia and as revenge for recent terrorist attacks in the UK.

Resham Khan reported that the Metropolitan Police took "several days" to take any statement from her and that the London Ambulance Service "took too long" to arrive; with the victims being driven to hospital by a bystander.

In an article for The Independent, Sufyan Ismail was critical of the media coverage of the incident, noting most mainstream media failed to cover the incident or "at best relegated it to a minor story". Ismail suggested that had the roles of the victims and perpetrator been reversed the case would have been headline news. He compared the acid attack to violent hate-murders of Muslims that had received little coverage in contrast with the murder of Jo Cox or that of Lee Rigby.

Government response
In an article for The Sunday Times on 16 July, Amber Rudd, the Home Secretary cited the attack on Khan and Mukhtar when she announced an "action plan to tackle acid attacks" which would include "wide-ranging review of the law enforcement and criminal justice response, of existing legislation, of access to harmful products and of the support offered to victims."

References

Attacks in the United Kingdom in 2017
2017 crimes in London
Acid attack victims
2017 Beckton acid attack
Chemical weapons attacks
History of the London Borough of Newham
June 2017 crimes in Europe
June 2017 events in the United Kingdom